Josef ben Isaac ibn Ezra was an oriental rabbi of the sixteenth and seventeenth centuries, descended from Ibn Ezra family of Spain. Brought up in Salonica, he studied under the direction of Rabbi Samuel de Medina, and became head of the Talmudic school there; among his pupils were Aaron Hazzan, Meir Melammed, and Shabbethai Jonah. Late in life Ibn Ezra was compelled to seek refuge in Constantinople, where he was called to the rabbinate of Sofia, and where he would die.

Writings
Ibn Ezra was a learned Talmudist, and his works were highly esteemed. He wrote: Rosh Yosef, a commentary on the Turim, of which the part treating of communal taxes and contributions was published at Salonica (1601), under the title Massa Melekh; Atzamot Yosef, commentary on Kiddushin (ib. 1601; Berlin, 1699; Fürth, 1767). In the preface to the latter the author states that the object of the commentary is to give, in addition to the ordinary exposition of the text (peshat), a clear, insight into the methodology of the Talmud. He states further that the responsa of Joseph ibn Leb (1576), which reached him after he had finished his commentary, compelled him to make some changes therein. Appended to the work are the halachic decisions of the treatise in question with explanations of some difficult passages in various other treatises. Ibn Ezra also wrote: a commentary on Bava Metzia, mentioned in the Azamot Yosef; rules for the interpretation of the Talmud; responsa, some of which are found in the Atzamot Yosef, the responsa of Salomon ha-Kohen, Samuel de medinas Beno Shemuel, and the Shai la-Mora of Shabbethai Jonah.

References 

 Its bibliography:
Introduction to the Azamot Yosef
David Conforte, Kore ha-Dorot, p. 43b;
Azulai, Shem ha-Gedolim, i. 77, ii. 108;
David Cassel, in Ersch and Gruber, Encyc. section ii., part 31, p. 74;
Moritz Steinschneider, Cat. Bodl. col. 1460.S. I. Br.

Sephardi rabbis
16th-century rabbis from the Ottoman Empire
17th-century rabbis from the Ottoman Empire
Rabbis from Thessaloniki
Rosh yeshivas
Year of death unknown
Year of birth unknown